Julia Carta (1561-fl. 1605) was an Italian folk healer.

She was active as a cunning woman.

She was prosecuted by the Spanish Inquisition on Sardinia for heresy because of alleged witchcraft and devil worship. The heresy trial against her lasted from 1596 and 1605, and is known as the most prominent and documented trials of the Inquisition in Sardinia. She was convicted of heresy. Documentation is however lacking on which punishment she was given and if she was executed or not.

References

16th-century Italian people
16th-century Italian women
17th-century Italian people
17th-century Italian women
Witch trials in Italy
Victims of the Inquisition
Cunning folk
People convicted of heresy